Mary D is an unincorporated community and coal town in Schuylkill County, Pennsylvania, United States. It is located in Schuylkill Township on U.S. Route 209 and the Schuylkill River forms its natural southeastern boundary.

Etymology
The community derives its name from Mary Delores Dodson, the wife of a local mine owner.

References

Unincorporated communities in Schuylkill County, Pennsylvania
Coal towns in Pennsylvania
Unincorporated communities in Pennsylvania